The Shiv Mandir of Ambarnath is a historic 11th-century Hindu temple, still in use, at Ambarnath near Mumbai, in Maharashtra, India.  It is also known as the Ambreshwar Shiva Temple, and known locally as Puratana Shivalaya. It is situated on the bank of Vadavan (Waldhuni) river, 2 km away from Ambarnath railway station (East). The temple was built in 1060 AD beautifully carved in stone. It was probably built by Shilahara king Chhittaraja, it may also have been rebuilt by his son Mummuni.

Unusually, the sanctuary or garbhagriha is below ground, reached by some 20 steps down from the mandapa, and is open to the sky as the shikhara tower above stops abruptly at a little above the height of the mandapa, and was apparently never completed.  It is in bhumija form, and if completed would have been close in form  to the Udayesvara Temple also known as Neelkantheshwara temple in Udaipur, Madhya Pradesh, begun in 1059, and the Gondeshwar Temple at Sinnar.  It is clear from what was built that the shikhara would have followed these in having four corner bands of gavaksha-honeycomb sweeping uninterrupted up the full height of the tower, while in between each face has rows of five spirelets on individual podia, reducing in size up the tower.

There's also a possibility that the shikhar here represents of Sky as the name suggests Ambarnath which means the Sky. अंबर in sanskrit is sky. So the shikhar here is sky and thus the tower might have not stopped abruptly.

The mandapa has three porches. Much of the exterior figure carving is damaged, but some female and divine figures remain.

References

Further reading
Harle, J.C., The Art and Architecture of the Indian Subcontinent, 2nd edn. 1994, Yale University Press Pelican History of Art, .
Michell, George, The Penguin Guide to the Monuments of India, Volume 1: Buddhist, Jain, Hindu, 1989, Penguin Books, .
Kanitkar, Kumud, "Ambarnath Shivalaya" A Monograph on the Temple at Ambarnath, Mumbai 2013,.

External links

 Sun News feature, quoting full description by Archaeological Survey of India
 ambernath shiv mandir

Buildings and structures completed in the 11th century
Buildings and structures in Maharashtra
Shiva temples in Maharashtra
Rebuilt buildings and structures in India
Ambarnath